H.R.256 also known as To repeal the Authorization for Use of Military Force Against Iraq Resolution of 2002, is a bill from the 117th United States Congress that would restrict United States involvement in the Iraq War, as well as repealing the 2002 AUMF. The motion was sponsored by Barbara Lee, the lone vote against the 2001 AUMF. The bill was co-sponsored by 134 representatives including 9 Republicans. 49 Republicans voted in favor of Lee's proposal while one Democrat (Elaine Luria) voted against the bill.

Similarly, Virginia Senator, Tim Kaine is sponsoring the Senate version of Barbara Lee's resolution, which has 46 cosponsors including 10 Republican senators.

Legislative history 
As of September 12, 2022

House vote

Democratic nay (1)
Elaine Luria

Republican yeas (49)

References

Proposed legislation of the 117th United States Congress
Non-interventionism
United States foreign relations legislation